The La Cruz Formation is an Aptian geologic formation in Argentina. Pterosaur fossils of Pterodaustro guinazui and Puntanipterus globosus and fish fossils of Austrolepidotes cuyanus, Pleuropholidae indet and Neosemionotus puntanus have been recovered from the formation. The formation, the uppermost unit of the El Gigante Group, overlies the El Toscal Formation, and is overlain by the Lagarcito Formation. The unit comprises sandstones and conglomerates, deposited in an alluvial plain to fluvial environment.

See also 
 List of pterosaur-bearing stratigraphic units

References

Bibliography

Further reading 

 J. F. Bonaparte and T. M. Sánchez. 1975. Restos de un pterosaurio, Puntanipterus globosus de la Formación La Cruz, Provincia de San Luis, Argentina [Remains of a pterosaur, Puntanipterus globosus from the La Cruz Formation, San Luis Province, Argentina]. Actas del Primer Congreso Argentino de Paleontologia y Bioestratigrafia, Tucumán 2:105-113

Geologic formations of Argentina
Lower Cretaceous Series of South America
Cretaceous Argentina
Aptian Stage
Sandstone formations
Conglomerate formations
Alluvial deposits
Fluvial deposits
Fossiliferous stratigraphic units of South America
Paleontology in Argentina
Geology of San Luis Province